Carlos Quintana (born 11 February 1988, in Glew) is an Argentine football defender who plays for Patronato, on loan from Argentinos Juniors in the Argentine Primera División.

Career
After completing the youth setup of Lanús, Quintana made his breakthrough in the first team during 2007. He won with Lanús de 2007 Apertura, the first league title in the history of the club.

In 2010, Quintana was loaned to Huracán for a 50,000 US dollars fee and an option to buy.

Honours

References

External links
 Argentine Primera statistics at Fútbol XXI
Lanus Player Profile

1988 births
Living people
Sportspeople from Buenos Aires Province
Argentine footballers
Association football defenders
Argentine Primera División players
Primera Nacional players
Club Atlético Lanús footballers
Club Atlético Huracán footballers
Club Atlético Douglas Haig players
Club Atlético Patronato footballers
Talleres de Córdoba footballers
Argentinos Juniors footballers